Angel Delgado is a Cuban visual artist who lives in Long Beach, California.

Biography 
Delgado studied at the Elementary School of Visual Arts of Havana, between 1976 and 1980. He graduated from the Escuela Nacional de Bellas Artes "San Alejandro" in 1984 and studied from 1984 to 1986 at the Instituto Superior de Arte in Havana.
The work of Angel Delgado, goes around a point: the freedom of the individual or the lack of this, his artwork is based fundamentally on the limitations, restrictions, prohibitions, controls and lack of freedoms that are imposed on the human being within the society. 
In May 1990, Delgado created a performance titled "La esperanza es lo último que se está perdiendo" in the group exhibition "El Objeto Esculturado" at Centro de Desarrollo de Artes Visuales, that led to the prison, where he spent 6 months of deprivation of freedom, this experience marked his life and his work.
In 2005, he left Cuba and decided to stay permanently in Mexico City. He lived there until 2013, when he decided to immigrate to the United States. Delgado currently lives and works in Long Beach, CA.

Selected individual exhibitions 

 Absent Speech, Building Bridges Art Exchange. Santa Monica, California. 2017 
Discurso Ausente, Galeria Seis Seis. Havana, Cuba. 2017 
Headlines, Galería Omar Alonso. Puerto Vallarta, Mexico, 2017 
Revision, Aluna Art Foundation, Miami, Florida. 2015
Constancy, Amanda Harris Gallery. Las Vegas, Nevada. 2014
Uncomfortable Landscape, Building Bridges Art Exchange. Santa Monica, California. 2014
Inside Outside, Jonathan Ferrara Gallery. New Orleans, Louisiana. 2011
 Limite Contínuo, Couturier Gallery. Los Angeles, California. 2009
Wake Up, Artane Gallery. Istanbul, Turkey. 2007
Constancias, Galería Nina Menocal. Mexico. 2006
Memorias acumuladas, Galería Fucares. Madrid, Spain. 2004
Sombra interior, Galería Nina Menocal. Mexico. 2003

Collective exhibitions 

 Unofficial, Kendall Art Center. Miami, Florida. 2018 
 Domestic Anxieties, chapter 3 of "On the Horizon. Pérez Art Museum Miami. Miami, Florida. 2018 
 Tatuare la Storia. Padiglione d'Arte Contemporanea. Milan, Italy, 2016 
 An Island Apart: Cuban Artists in Exile. Miller Gallery at Carnegie Mellon University. Westerville, Ohio. 2016
 Mobility and Its Discontents, The 8th Floor. New York. 2015 
 Apertura: Photography in Cuba Today, Chazen Museum of Art. Madison, Wisconsin. 2015 
 55 Premio Internazionale Bugatti Segantini, Nova Milanese (MB), 2014 
 Neues Sehen – New Vision. Till Richter Museum. Germany. 2013 
 Citizens of the World: Cuba in Queens. Queens Museum. Nueva York. 2013 
 La Revolución no será televisada, Bronx Museum of the Arts. New York. 2012 
 Video Cubano, Rubin Museum of Art. New York. 2011 
 Arte no es Vida: Actions by Artists of the Americas, 1960-2000. Museo del Barrio. New York. 2008

Awards and honors 

In 2004, he obtained an artist residency at Mattress Factory in Philadelphia.
In 2008, he won the Museum of Latin American Art award in the category of sculpture and installation in Long Beach, California.
In 2016, he is part of The Fountainhead Residency, Miami, Fl.

Further reading 
 Mendoza, Alexis. Angel Delgado. Drawing Inventory: Them and Now. CdeCuba.org. Magazine 26, January–June, 2019.
 Una mirada cubana a la manipulación mediática. La Voz de América Noticias, December, 2017.
 Rojas, Luis Felipe. El pintor cubano Angel Delgado y su obsesión por la libertad. Radio Televisión Martí, July, 2015.
 Revision: Angel Delgado. Aluna Art Foundation, April, 2015.
 Perez Moreno, Yanet. La obra de Ángel Delgado, preso en 1990 por realizar una performance. Cubaencuentro, September, 2009.
 Antón Castillo, Héctor. Angel Delgado, Galería Nina Menocal. Art Nexus. June - August, 2007, p. 129-130
 Espinosa Magaly. Antología de textos críticos: El Nuevo Arte Cubano, p. 65
 Gallegos, Carina y Martell, Marisol. Art Basel Miami Beach 2005. Art Nexus, No. 56 2005, p. 118-121
 Hernández, Orlando. Angel Delgado. Bomb 2002-2003, p. 38-39
 Maccash, Doug. No Artist Is An Island. The Times Picayune, March 1, 2002, p. 18
 Hernández, Orlando. Letter from Havana. Art Nexus, No. 40, 2001, p. 72-75
 Israel, Nico. VII Bienal de La Habana. ArtForum. February 2001, p. 147-148
 Expone en Miami Ángel Delgado, Primer Artista Cubano Preso Por su Obra. Neorika.

References 

Living people
1965 births
20th-century Cuban artists
20th-century Cuban male artists
21st-century Cuban artists
Artists from Havana